Alan John Kwadwo Kyerematen (born 3 October 1955) is a Ghanaian politician who served as Minister for Trade and Industry from 2017 to 2023.  Kyerematen was Ambassador of Ghana to the United States and later Minister of Trade, Industry, Private Sector Development (PSD) and the Presidential Special Initiatives (PSI), under the President Kufuor-led NPP government. Kyerematen served as a trade advisor at the United Nations Economic Commission for Africa (ECA) in Addis Ababa, Ethiopia, where he coordinated the African Trade Policy Centre (ATPC). 

Kyerematen made an attempt at the leadership of the New Patriotic Party in 2007, capturing 32.3% of votes cast. He was first runner-up to Nana Akufo-Addo who gained 47.96% of votes cast. Kyerematen made other attempts at the party's leadership in 2010 and 2014 but placed second to Akufo-Addo, who won the primaries.  In 2012, Ghana nominated Kyerematen for the post of WTO director-general to succeed out-going Director-General Pascal Lamy, and his candidature received the backing of the African Union (AU). However, he did not make the shortlist for the final selection process in 2013.

Early life
Alan John Kwadwo Kyerematen was born on 3 October 1955 to Alexander Atta Yaw Kyerematen, a social anthropologist from Patasse, Kumasi and Victoria Kyerematen (née Welsing) from Elmina and Ejisu. He was named after an archbishop of the Church of England, Alan John Knight who was the headmaster of the all-boys Anglican boarding school, Adisadel College in Cape Coast in the 1930s, and a mentor to his father, Alexander A. Y. Kyerematen who was then a student there and later, a head boy in his final year. A. A. Y. Kyerematen was the commissioner for Local Government during the National Liberation Council regime. In 1951, his father became the founder and first director of the Centre for National Culture located in Kumasi of the Ashanti Region and later on, he was appointed the mayor of Kumasi and the commissioner for local government between 1966 and 1969. Like his father before him, Alan Kyerematen attended Adisadel College for his secondary education, entering the institution at the record age of nine years after starting out at then Asokore Mampong Secondary School now Kumasi Academy. He attended the prestigious Achimota School afterwards for his sixth form education. He proceeded to the University of Ghana, Legon for a bachelor's degree in Economics. Kyerematen also holds a law degree, LLB from the Ghana Law School at the same university where he qualified as a barrister-at-Law. He was called to the bar in Ghana, and is a practicing attorney–at-law in Ghana. In addition, he is a Hubert Humphrey fellow of the School of Management at the University of Minnesota, U.S., having completed one year management studies under the Fulbright Fellowship program at that institution.

Corporate career
Alan John Kyerematen has had an extensive and successful professional career in both the private and public sector spanning a period of over twenty-four years. He was a senior corporate executive with a subsidiary of Unilever International in Ghana where he became a junior manager at the age of twenty-two years. He also worked for a number of years as a principal consultant and head of Public Systems Management with one of the leading management development institutions in Ghana, the Management Development and Productivity Institute (MDPI).

In 1998, Kyerematen was appointed by the UNDP as the first regional director of Enterprise Africa, which was an Africa-wide, flagship initiative for the development and promotion of small and medium enterprises. Under that framework, he established enterprise support institutions and programmes in 13 Sub-Saharan Africa countries - Botswana, Benin, Cameroon, Democratic Republic of Congo, Ethiopia, Mauritius, Mozambique, Namibia, Nigeria, Senegal, South Africa and Uganda. Over 4,000 African entrepreneurs and small businesses have benefited from these programmes.

In 1990, Kyerematen was responsible for establishing and managing the EMPRETEC Programme in Ghana, a leading business development programme sponsored by the United Nations and Barclays Bank. He led the transformation of EMPRETEC from a UN project into an independent foundation, and as its founding chief executive, developed the foundation into a world-class institution which is recognized as a successful model and best practice institution for enterprise development in Africa. Between 1984 and 1990, he participated in and managed a number of major private and public sector consulting assignments in Ghana, as a principal consultant and head of Public Systems Management with the Management Development and Productivity Institute (MDPI), a leading management development institution in Ghana. Prior to this, he was a senior corporate executive with UAC Ghana Ltd, a subsidiary of Unilever International, where he worked in various managerial positions with distinction until 1984.

Kyerematen is a member of the Council of Governors of the British Executive Service Overseas (BESO) in the UK and also a board member of other organizations in Ghana.

In 1994, Kyerematen was listed by the Time magazine as one of the 100 global leaders for the new millennium, alongside Bill Gates, John F. Kennedy Jr., and others.

Diplomacy and international public service
Kyerematen was appointed Ghana's ambassador to the U.S. when the NPP came into office in 2001. He served as a trade advisor at the UN Economic Commission for Africa (ECA) in Addis Ababa, Ethiopia. He headed the African Trade Policy Centre (ATPC); a centre created by the ECA with the main objective of strengthening the human and institutional capacities of African governments to formulate and implement sound trade policies and participates more effectively in trade negotiations at the bilateral, regional and multilateral levels.

Kyerematen is one of the leading members of the technical team that provided strategic guidance and support to the African Union Commission in developing and elaborating an Action Plan for Boosting intra-African Trade and preparing a framework for the establishment of a Continental Free Trade Area. As part of this effort, he was designated as a Special Envoy of the African Union to hold consultations with selected African Heads of State prior to the 18th African Union Summit of Heads of State and Government in January 2012.

Ghana, on 17 December 2012, nominated Alan John Kwadwo Kyerematen for the post of WTO Director-General to succeed the former Director-General, Pascal Lamy, whose term of office expired on 31 August 2013. His candidature received the backing of the Africa Union (AU) but he did not make the final shortlist for the position  Over the years, Kyerematen has been invited to speak at various fora, sharing his expertise on international topics on the dynamics of global trade and sustainable development.

Politics

Party advocacy
Kyerematen has been a leading stalwart and key strategist of the NPP since its inception in 1992. He is a founding member of the New Patriotic Party (NPP) and has also served on the highest decision-making bodies of the NPP that shaped the Party's strategic direction both in opposition and in Government.

He served on the NPP National Executive Committee, serving as a Member from 1992 to 2001 as well as on the Economic Management Team  and Finance Committee of the NPP. He is also a Founding Member of the Young Executive Forum (YEF), a youth advocacy and lobby group within the Party.As Chairman of YEF from 1992 to 2001, he symbolized the essence and spirit of the new generation of party leaders.

Kyerematen has been one of the privileged few to have held membership of the National Executive Committee for over a decade, under the successive Chairmanships of B.J. DaRocha, Peter Ala Adjetey, Samuel Odoi-Sykes and  Haruna Esseku. As a result of his contribution to strategy development within the Party, he was appointed as a Member of the NPP/CPP Great Alliance Negotiating Team.

Kyerematen made an attempt at the leadership of the New Patriotic Party in 2007, capturing 32.30% of votes cast. He was first runner-up to Nana Addo Dankwa Akufo-Addo who gained 47.96% of votes cast. He made another attempt in 2010 where he placed second with 20.40% of total valid votes cast to Nana Akufo-Addo's 77.92%. In 2014, he once again came second to Akufo-Addo in the presidential primaries to elect a flag-bearer to lead the NPP in the 2016 general elections. At the congress organised to shortlist the number of prospective candidates from 7 to 5, Kyerematen polled 7.97% of the valid votes cast compared to Akufo-Addo's 80.81%. In the final presidential primary to select the flagbearer, Kyerematen was first runner-up with 4.75% of the votes while archrival Akufo-Addo received 94.35% of the votes to win the contest.

He has been nicknamed as Alan Cash. Once asked by a journalist how he became known in the Ghanaian media as "Alan Cash," Kyerematen said it happened because in political campaigns he stressed the importance of creating jobs and "real cash" for the people.

On January 11, 2023, Alan John Kyerematen officially announced his intention to contest the NPP’s flagbearership race and also officially resigned from his position as the Minister for Trade and Industry.

Cabinet minister
In 2003, Alan Kyerematen was appointed as the Cabinet Minister with responsibility for Trade, Industry and the President's Special Initiatives (PSI) with additional responsibility for Private Sector Development (PSD). In that capacity, he spearheaded the development and implementation of innovative programmes which have become new strategic pillars of growth for the transformation of the Ghanaian economy. Concrete manifestations of these special initiatives  are:

 An $8.5 million state-of-the-art factory, which produces high grade industrial starch from cassava for export to key markets in Europe, Africa and Asia. The starch initiative created over 10,000 jobs and piloted a new innovative approach in rural industry development based on the concept of Corporate Village Enterprises. In addition, it was considered as a model in linking developing countries into the global supply chain through industrial agro-processing. The first industrial starch company was certified as a global supplier of high grade starch to Nestle operations worldwide.
 The construction of a multimillion-dollar enclave within the Tema Free Zone, dedicated to garments manufacturing for the export market by Ghanaian entrepreneurs. The enclave is also being extended and converted to accommodate similar facilities for Furniture Manufacturing and an ICT Park, thus converting part of the Free Zones into a multi-purpose Industrial Park.
 The major component activities implemented include the establishment of Export Trade Houses, the establishment of a "Furniture City" at Tema - an enclave for manufacturers of wood export products, the establishment of product galleries to promote Made-in-Ghana goods and the establishment of a Technology Innovation Center for Capital Goods Manufacturing.
 The revival of the Oil Palm industry in Ghana, achieving a phenomenal growth in seedlings: supply rose from 250,000 seedlings per annum in 2001 to 4 million as at the end of 2004, from twelve nursery sites. Programme initiated under which over 102,000 hectares Oil palm plantation is being cultivated.
 Mobilizing new investments to expand Salt mining operations in Ghana and provide a stable raw material base for the development of a caustic soda industry to feed other manufacturing industries. Ghana's non-traditional export sector has grown from $400 million in 2000 to the level of $800 million in 2005.
 The roll-out and implementation of the Districts Industrialisation Programme, a comprehensive programme for rural industrialization involving the setting up of at least one medium-sized factory in each administrative district in Ghana.

As Minister for Trade, Industry, he has coordinated Government of Ghana's trade policy agenda in respect of multilateral trade negotiations, including WTO, EU-ACP Economic Partnership Agreement and ECOWAS. He played lead roles in both the regional preparatory process towards the WTO Cancun and Hong Kong Ministerial Meetings, particularly during the latter, in which he was one of the privileged few amongst Trade Ministers in the World, to have been appointed as a member of the Chairman's Consultative Group. He was also the only Trade Minister from Africa to have been selected as a panelist on Trade during the 2006 World Economic Forum in Davos. 

He has also led the negotiation and development of bilateral trade and economic relations between the Government of Ghana and its major trading partners, including the UK, US, Canada, Germany, France, Italy, Japan, China, Denmark, South Africa, Nigeria, etc. He had been a leading member of the NPP Government team promoting Ghana abroad and attracting and facilitating foreign direct investment into the country, and has also been responsible for developing a comprehensive internal trade and import management portfolio aimed at enhancing the competitiveness of local products, promoting fair trade and protecting consumer interests as well as promoting Made-in-Ghana products through campaigns such as the highly successful "National Friday Wear" programme.

Under his direction, a comprehensive Ghana Trade Policy has for the first time in the history of Ghana been launched as a major plank in Government's strategy for accelerating and sustaining economic growth and increasing incomes and employment. The Trade Policy provides clear and transparent guidelines for the comprehensive implementation of Government's domestic and international trade agenda. In addition, he led the process of preparing a $200-million implementation blueprint, called the Trade Sector Support Programme (TSSP), which was launched in October 2005.

He also negotiated a $45 million facility with the World Bank to promote small and medium enterprise development in Ghana. Another major achievement of Kyerematen was to develop the Trade Ministry into a professional service organization with the Ministry being restructured into strategic business units with an efficient programme coordination and management system.

Additionally, as part of a government investment delegation, Alan Kyerematen was instrumental in the negotiation of the contract that led to the arrival of Dallas, Texas - based start-up company, Kosmos Energy to Ghana to explore and discover oil in commercial quantities which generates large revenue inflows for the state annually.
In May, 2017, President Nana Akufo-Addo named Alan Kyerematen as part of nineteen ministers who would form his cabinet. The names of the 19 ministers were submitted the Parliament of Ghana and announced by the Speaker of the House, Rt. Hon. Prof. Mike Ocquaye.

Resignation
On January 7, 2023, Alan Kyeremanten took to twitter to announce his resignation as cabinet minister responsible for trade and industry effective 16th January.  Other sources indicate that he wrote to the presidency indicating his intention to resign effective from 16 January 2023 and this was accepted by President Akufo-Addo.

Personal life
Coming from a mixed Akan ancestry of the Asante and Fante ethnic subgroups, he speaks Twi and Fanti fluently. In addition, he speaks Ga and is proficient in French. He is married to Patricia Christabel Kyerematen (née Kingsley-Nyinah), the daughter of Joseph Kingsley-Nyinah who was an Appeal Court Judge and the Electoral Commissioner for Ghana between 1978 and 1981, including 1979 presidential election. They have two children - Alexander and Victor. Alan Kyerematen's sister Bridget Kyerematen – Darko died in a gas explosion in January 2017.  Alan Kyerematen along with his elder brother Stephen Kyerematen are managing directors of A Wealth of Women Ghana BKD (Bridget Kyerematen Darko),led by Dr. Sandi Williams, PhD  a foundation formed to support their late sister's work and legacy. The foundation is affiliated to A Wealth of Women.

References

1955 births
Living people
Akan people
Carlson School of Management alumni
University of Ghana alumni
Alumni of Achimota School
Alumni of Adisadel College
Ambassadors of Ghana to the United States
20th-century Ghanaian lawyers
New Patriotic Party politicians
Ghana School of Law alumni
People from Kumasi
Cabinet Ministers of Ghana
Fante people
Ashanti people
Kumasi Academy alumni
Ghanaian lawyers